Stanley Morris (30 November 1919 – 31 October 2010) was a British painter. His work was part of the painting event in the art competition at the 1948 Summer Olympics.

References

1919 births
2010 deaths
20th-century British painters
British male painters
Olympic competitors in art competitions
People from Handsworth, West Midlands
20th-century British male artists